Tarun is a town in Bikapur tehsil, Faizabad district in the Indian state of Uttar Pradesh, India. Tarun is 30 km south of district headquarters Ayodhya city.

Tarun is also a block in Faizabad district. There is a police station in Tarun. Tarun is a part of Goshainganj Vidhan Sabha constituency and Ambedkar Nagar Lok Sabha constituency.

Transport

Road

Tarun is well connected with nearby cities Faizabad, Ayodhya, Sultanpur and Akbarpur. And also Goshainganj, Bikapur, Bhadarsa, Haiderganj, Masodha and Chaure Bazar towns are the nearby towns from Tarun, Ayodhya.

Railway

Goshainganj, Faizabad Junction, Ayodhya Junction and Chaure Bazar are the nearby railway stations from Tarun.

Air

Maryada Purushottam Shri Ram International Airport (Ayodhya) is the nearest airport from Tarun, Ayodhya.

Demographics
 India census, Tarun Bazaar had a population of 15,990. Males constitute 51% of the population and females 49%. Tarun Bazaar has an average literacy rate of 62%, higher than the national average of 59.5%: male literacy is 71%, and female literacy is 52%. In Tarun Bazaar, 17% of the population is under 6 years of age.

References

Cities and towns in Faizabad district